Paide Linnameeskond is a professional football club based in Paide, Estonia that competes in the Meistriliiga, the top flight of Estonian football. The club's home ground is Paide linnastaadion.

Founded in 2004, the club has played in the Meistriliiga since 2009 and has never been relegated. Paide Linnameeskond have won the Estonian Cup once, in 2021–22.

History
Paide Linnameeskond was founded in 2004 as a satellite club of Flora. The team entered the Western division of the IV liiga and saw four consecutive promotions from 2005 to 2008, when they were promoted to the Meistriliiga. Paide Linnameeskond finished their first season in the Estonian top flight in ninth place, but escaped relegation by defeating Warrior 2–1 on aggregate in the play-offs.

In July 2010, former Paide Linnameeskond player Meelis Rooba was appointed as manager. The club reached the 2014–15 Estonian Cup final, but lost to Nõmme Kalju 0–2. Rooba resigned as manager after the 2016 season and was replaced by another former player, Vjatšeslav Zahovaiko. Under Zahovaiko Paide Linnameeskond established itself as one of the top teams in the top flight, finishing 5th in 2018, 4th in 2019, and 2nd in 2020, earning their first ever European place finish. 
Zahovaiko left Paide after leading the club to third in the 2021 season, being replaced by former player and Estonian national team coach Karel Voolaid.

In June 2021, Paide Linnameeskond announced its formal affiliation with the Gambian football club Real de Banjul. Throughout the cooperation between Paide Linnameeskond and Real de Banjul, multiple Gambian footballers have used Paide as a stepping stone, including Alassana Jatta and Muhammed Sanneh.

The 2022-23 season saw Paide win their first European ties against FC Dinamo Tbilisi and FC Ararat-Armenia in the Europa Conference League first and second qualifying rounds, both on penalties. Paide hosted European matches at both rounds at the 1,500-capacity Pärnu Rannastaadion due to their own 500-capacity Paide linnastaadion not meeting UEFA Category 2 Stadium requirements. Their third qualifying round home debut, a 2-0 defeat to R.S.C. Anderlecht of Belgium, was played at the 14,336-capacity Lilleküla Stadium.

Players

Current squad

For season transfers, see transfers summer 2022 and transfers winter 2022–23.

Out on loan

Reserves and academy

Club officials

Coaching staff

Managerial history

Honours
 Estonian Cup
 Winners (1): 2021–22
 Runners-up (1): 2014–15

 Estonian Supercup
 Winners (1): 2023
 Runners-up (1): 2021

Kit manufacturers and shirt sponsors

Seasons and statistics

Seasons

Europe

References

External links

  
 Paide Linnameeskond at Estonian Football Association

 
2004 establishments in Estonia
Association football clubs established in 2004
Football clubs in Estonia
Meistriliiga clubs
Sport in Paide